Johnny Mercer's Music Shop is an old-time radio program that featured popular songs. It was broadcast on NBC from June 22, 1943, until September 14, 1943, as a summer replacement for The Pepsodent Show. A similar program with a slightly different title was broadcast in 1944. 

Mercer was a guest on The Pepsodent Show'''s season finale, providing a transition to the premiere of his own program the following week. The show originated from WEAF and was sponsored by Pepsodent toothpaste.

Singers Ella Mae Morse and Jo Stafford were regulars on the program, with musical support from The Pied Pipers and Paul Weston and his orchestra. Although the program's cast was white, episodes sometimes presented a black image. For example, the first episode included both the song "Louisville Lou (That Vampin' Lady)", which is about a black stripper, and a minstrel show skit.

A review in the trade publication Billboard praised the program's musical performances but noted that its comedy components needed to be improved to better match Mercer's personality, which the Encyclopedia of Music in the 20th Century'' commented was "so suited to the medium."

The Chesterfield Music Shop (1944)
As the title implies, Chesterfield cigarettes sponsored this 15-minute program, which ran from June 12, 1944, until December 8, 1944 on NBC. Members of the cast were the same as those in the 1943 program, except for the addition of Wendell Niles as announcer. In addition to the NBC broadcasts, the show was also carried by the Armed Forces Radio Service for transmission to United States military personnel.

References

External links

Logs
Log of selected episodes of Johnny Mercer's Music Shop from Old Time Radio Researchers Group

Script
Script of Johnny Mercer's Chesterfield Music Shop (June 12, 1944)

Streaming
Episodes of Johnny Mercer's Music Shop from Dumb.com
Episodes of Johnny Mercer's Music Shop from Old Time Radio Researchers Group Library

1943 radio programme debuts
1943 radio programme endings
1940s American radio programs
NBC radio programs
American music radio programs
Johnny Mercer